Charles de Bourbon may refer to:

 Charles I, Duke of Bourbon (1401–1456)
 Charles II, Duke of Bourbon (1434–1488), also Cardinal and archbishop of Lyon
 Charles III, Duke of Bourbon (1490–1527), Bourbon-Montpensier
 Charles de Bourbon, Duke of Vendôme (1489–1537), Bourbon-La Marche
 Charles, Cardinal de Bourbon (1523–1590), Bourbon-La Marche, archbishop of Rouen and also Cardinal
  (1562–1594)
  (1554–1610)
 Charles de Bourbon, comte de Soissons (1566–1612), Bourbon-Soissons
 Charles de Bourbon, Duc de Berry (1686–1714)
 Charles III of Spain, known as Charles of Bourbon (1716–1788), King of Spain, Naples, and Sicily